Peter McKay or Peter MacKay may refer to:

Politicians

 Peter MacKay (born 1965), Canadian politician
 Peter McKay (Australian politician) (born 1948), member of the Tasmanian Legislative Council

Others
 Peter Mackay, 4th Earl of Inchcape (born 1943)
 Peter McKay (cricketer) (born 1994), English cricketer
 Peter McKay (curator), Australian art curator at Queensland Art Gallery and Gallery of Modern Art
 Peter McKay (footballer) (1925–2000), Scottish footballer
 Peter Mackay (journalist) (1926–2013) British-Southern African political activist